The 1993 Illinois Fighting Illini football team was an American football team that represented the University of Illinois at Urbana-Champaign during the 1993 NCAA Division I-A football season. In their third year under head coach Lou Tepper, the Illini compiled a 5–6 record and finished in a tie for fifth place in the Big Ten Conference.

Johnny Johnson led the team with 1,688 passing yards, while Ty Douthard led with 599 rushing yards and 406 receiving yards.  Tackle Brad Hopkins was selected by the Associated Press as a first-team player on the 1993 All-Big Ten Conference football team.

Schedule

Roster

References

Illinois
Illinois Fighting Illini football seasons
Illinois Fighting Illini football